Jiří Prchal (19 August 1948 – 9 September 1994) was a Czech cyclist. He competed in the individual road race at the 1972 Summer Olympics.

References

External links
 

1948 births
1994 deaths
Czech male cyclists
Olympic cyclists of Czechoslovakia
Cyclists at the 1972 Summer Olympics
Place of birth missing